Pirömerli is a village in Tarsus district of Mersin Province, Turkey. It is situated on the lower slopes of the Taurus Mountains. The population of Pirömerli was 359 as of 2012. The village is a Turkmen village. The main economic sector of the village is agriculture and grape is the main product.

References

Villages in Tarsus District